The American Astronomical Society (AAS, sometimes spoken as "double-A-S") is an American society of professional astronomers and other interested individuals, headquartered in Washington, DC. The primary objective of the AAS is to promote the advancement of astronomy and closely related branches of science, while the secondary purpose includes enhancing astronomy education and providing a political voice for its members through lobbying and grassroots activities. Its current mission is to enhance and share humanity's scientific understanding of the universe as a diverse and inclusive astronomical community.

History 

The society was founded in 1899 through the efforts of George Ellery Hale. The constitution of the group was written by Hale, George Comstock, Edward Morley, Simon Newcomb and Edward Charles Pickering. These men, plus four others, were the first Executive Council of the society; Newcomb was the first president. The initial membership was 114. The AAS name of the society was not finally decided until 1915, previously it was the "Astronomical and Astrophysical Society of America". One proposed name that preceded this interim name was "American Astrophysical Society".

The AAS today has over 8,000 members and six divisions – the Division for Planetary Sciences (1968), the Division on Dynamical Astronomy (1969), the High Energy Astrophysics Division (1969), the Solar Physics Division (1969), the Historical Astronomy Division (1980) and the Laboratory Astrophysics Division (2012). The membership includes physicists, mathematicians, geologists, engineers and others whose research interests lie within the broad spectrum of subjects now comprising contemporary astronomy.

In 2019 three AAS members were selected into the tenth anniversary class of TED Fellows.

The AAS established the AAS Fellows program in 2019 to "confer recognition upon AAS members for achievement and extraordinary service to the field of astronomy and the American Astronomical Society." The inaugural class was designated by the AAS Board of Trustees and includes an initial group of 232 Legacy Fellows.

Divisions 

Because the field of astronomy is diverse, several divisions have been formed each of which promotes and enables a different branch of astronomy or astronomy-related science as well as working within the overall charter of the AAS. Many of the divisions hold separate meetings in addition to meeting with the main group. The divisions of the AAS, together with their main research interests, are:

 The Division for Planetary Sciences (DPS) supports planetology and exploration of the Solar System.
 The Division on Dynamical Astronomy (DDA) supports research on the dynamics (orbits, evolution, and history) of astronomical systems from the Solar System to superclusters of galaxies on cosmological scales.
 The High Energy Astrophysics Division (HEAD) supports knowledge about high energy events, particles, quanta, relativistic gravitational fields, and related phenomena in the astrophysical universe.
 The Historical Astronomy Division (HAD) supports topics relevant to the history of astronomy as a field, and research using historical astronomical records to solve current problems in astronomy.
 The Solar Physics Division (SPD) supports solar physics (astrophysical research on the Sun), and its interactions with the Solar System and Earth.
 In 2012, a new division was formed: the Laboratory Astrophysics Division (LAD) to advance humanity's understanding of the Universe through the promotion of fundamental theoretical and experimental research into the underlying processes that drive the Universe.

Publications 

 Astronomical Journal
 Astronomy Education Review [no longer published]
 The Astrophysical Journal
 The Planetary Science Journal
 Bulletin of the American Astronomical Society
 Research Notes of the AAS (scientific publication of brief communications, non peer-reviewed)
AAS Nova, an online publication with highlights from the research journals of the Society.
In June 2019 AAS announced that it would be the new publisher of Sky & Telescope.
In August 2020 AAS announced that it had acquired the inventory, author contracts and related assets of Willmann-Bell, Inc. a publisher of astronomical books, atlases and software.

Prizes 

The Henry Norris Russell Lectureship, for lifetime achievement in astronomy
The Newton Lacy Pierce Prize in Astronomy, for outstanding early career in observational astronomy
The Helen B. Warner Prize for Astronomy, for outstanding early career in theoretical astronomy
The Beatrice M. Tinsley Prize, for a creative or innovating contribution to astronomy
The Joseph Weber Award, for a significant advance in astronomical instrumentation
The Dannie Heineman Prize for Astrophysics (joint award with the American Institute of Physics), for outstanding work in astrophysics
The George Van Biesbroeck Prize, for outstanding service to astronomy
The Annie J. Cannon Award in Astronomy (awarded in concert with the American Association of University Women), for outstanding early career by a female astronomer
the Chambliss Astronomical Writing Award for astronomy writing for an academic audience
The Beth Brown Memorial Award for exemplary poster and oral research presentation by undergraduate and graduate students
The Chambliss Astronomy Achievement Student Award for exemplary research by undergraduate and graduate students 
The Chambliss Amateur Achievement Award for exemplary research by an amateur astronomer
The AAS Education Prize for outstanding contributions to astronomy education (formerly called the Annenberg Foundation Award)

Similar prizes are awarded by AAS divisions. These include:

The Gerard P. Kuiper Prize (DPS), for lifetime achievement in planetary science
The Harold C. Urey Prize (DPS), for outstanding early career in planetary science
The Harold Masursky Meritorious Service Award (DPS), for outstanding service to planetary science
The Brouwer Award (DDA), for lifetime achievement in dynamical astronomy
The Bruno Rossi Prize (HEAD), for a significant recent contribution to high-energy astrophysics
The LeRoy E. Doggett Prize (HAD), for work in the history of astronomy
The George Ellery Hale Prize (SPD), for lifetime achievement in solar astronomy
The Karen Harvey Prize (SPD), for outstanding early career in solar astronomy

The AAS also manages an International Travel Grant program, which any astronomer working in the US may apply to for travel to international astronomy-related conferences and other smaller grant and award programs. American Astronomical Society won the 2020 Webby People's Voice Award for Association in the category Web.

Past presidents
The following past and present members served as president of the society during the listed periods:

 Simon Newcomb (1899–1905)
 Edward Charles Pickering (1905–1919)
 Frank Schlesinger (1919–1922)
 William Wallace Campbell (1922–1925)
 George Cary Comstock (1925–1928)
 Ernest William Brown (1928–1931)
 Walter Sydney Adams (1931–1934)
 Henry Norris Russell (1934–1937)
 Robert Grant Aitken (1937–1940)
 Joel Stebbins (1940–1943)
 Harlow Shapley (1943–1946)
 Otto Struve (1946–1949)
 Alfred Harrison Joy (1949–1952)
 Robert Raynolds McMath (1952–1954)
 Donald Howard Menzel (1954–1956)
 Paul Willard Merrill (1956–1958)
 Gerald Maurice Clemence (1958–1960)
 Lyman Spitzer, Jr. (1960–1962)
 Carlyle Smith Beals (1962–1964)
 Leo Goldberg (1964–1966)
 Bengt Strömgren (1966–1967)
 Albert E. Whitford (1967–1970)
 Martin Schwarzschild (1970–1972)
 Bart J. Bok (1972–1974)
 Robert Paul Kraft (1974–1976)
 E. Margaret Burbidge (1976–1978)
 Ivan R. King (1978–1980)
 David S. Heeschen (1980–1982)
 Arthur D. Code (1982–1984)
 Maarten Schmidt (1984–1986)
 Bernard F. Burke (1986–1988)
 Donald Edward Osterbrock (1988–1990)
 John Norris Bahcall (1990–1992)
 Sidney C. Wolff (1992–1994)
 Frank Shu (1994–1996)
 Andrea K. Dupree (1996–1998)
 Robert D. Gehrz (1998–2000)
 Anneila I. Sargent (2000–2002)
 Catherine A. Pilachowski (2002–2004)
 Robert P. Kirshner (2004–2006)
 J. Craig Wheeler (2006–2008)
 John Peter Huchra (2008–2010)
 Debra M. Elmegreen (2010–2012)
 David Helfand (2012–2014)
 Meg Urry (2014–2016)
 Christine Jones-Foreman (2016–2018)
 Megan Donahue (2018–2020)
 Paula Szkody (2020–2022)

See also 
 215th meeting of the American Astronomical Society
 List of astronomical societies

References

External links 
 
 

 
Astronomy societies
Scientific organizations established in 1899
Scientific societies based in the United States
1899 establishments in the United States